The following lists events that happened during 2016 in Japan.
Year: Heisei 28

Incumbents
Emperor: Akihito
Prime Minister: Shinzō Abe (L–Yamaguchi)
Chief Cabinet Secretary: Yoshihide Suga (L–Kanagawa)
Chief Justice of the Supreme Court: Itsurō Terada
President of the House of Representatives: Tadamori Oshima (L–Aomori)
President of the House of Councillors: Masaaki Yamazaki (L–Fukui) until July 25, Chūichi Date (L-Hokkaidō) from August 1
National Diets: 190th (regular session, January 4–June 1), 191st (extraordinary session, August 1–3), 192nd (extraordinary session, September 26–November 30 [unless extended or cut short by lower house dissolution])

Governors
Aichi Prefecture: Hideaki Omura
Akita Prefecture: Norihisa Satake
Aomori Prefecture: Shingo Mimura
Chiba Prefecture: Kensaku Morita
Ehime Prefecture: Tokihiro Nakamura
Fukui Prefecture: Issei Nishikawa 
Fukuoka Prefecture: Hiroshi Ogawa
Fukushima Prefecture: Masao Uchibori
Gifu Prefecture: Hajime Furuta
Gunma Prefecture: Masaaki Osawa 
Hiroshima Prefecture: Hidehiko Yuzaki
Hokkaido: Harumi Takahashi
Hyogo Prefecture: Toshizō Ido
Ibaraki Prefecture: Masaru Hashimoto 
Ishikawa Prefecture: Masanori Tanimoto
Iwate Prefecture: Takuya Tasso
Kagawa Prefecture: Keizō Hamada
Kagoshima Prefecture: Satoshi Mitazono 
Kanagawa Prefecture: Yuji Kuroiwa
Kochi Prefecture: Masanao Ozaki 
Kumamoto Prefecture: Ikuo Kabashima
Kyoto Prefecture: Keiji Yamada 
Mie Prefecture: Eikei Suzuki
Miyagi Prefecture: Yoshihiro Murai
Miyazaki Prefecture: Shunji Kōno
Nagano Prefecture: Shuichi Abe
Nagasaki Prefecture: Hōdō Nakamura 
Nara Prefecture: Shōgo Arai
Niigata Prefecture: Hirohiko Izumida (until 27 October); Ryūichi Yoneyama (starting 27 October)
Oita Prefecture: Katsusada Hirose
Okayama Prefecture: Ryuta Ibaragi
Okinawa Prefecture: Takeshi Onaga
Osaka Prefecture: Ichirō Matsui
Saga Prefecture: Yoshinori Yamaguchi
Saitama Prefecture: Kiyoshi Ueda 
Shiga Prefecture: Taizō Mikazuki
Shiname Prefecture: Zenbe Mizoguchi
Shizuoka Prefecture: Heita Kawakatsu
Tochigi Prefecture: Tomikazu Fukuda
Tokushima Prefecture: Kamon Iizumi
Tokyo: 
 until 21 June: Yōichi Masuzoe
 21 June-2 August: Tatsumi Ando
 starting 2 August: Yuriko Koike
Tottori Prefecture: Shinji Hirai
Toyama Prefecture: Takakazu Ishii 
Wakayama Prefecture: Yoshinobu Nisaka
Yamagata Prefecture: Mieko Yoshimura
Yamaguchi Prefecture: Tsugumasa Muraoka
Yamanashi Prefecture: Hitoshi Gotō

Events

January
Record snowfall and the first Sumo tournament win in a decade for a Japanese rikishi, amid turmoil on the Nikkei 225 and a political scandal involving Abe's cabinet. (See Akira Amari)
Filmmaker and dolphin activist Ric O'Barry was refused entry to the country and was held prior to deportation.

February
February 17 - launch of Hitomi (satellite), ChubuSat-2, ChubuSat-3 and Horyu-4 using a H-IIA 202 space launch vehicle

March
March 11 - Japan commemorates the fifth anniversary of the 2011 Tohoku earthquake and tsunami and the subsequent of Fukushima nuclear disaster.
March 25 - Kyoto Tamba Kogen Quasi-National Park is established
March 25 - Asagishi, Hanasaki (Hokkaido), Higashi-Oiwake, Kami-Shirataki, Kanehana, Kyū-Shirataki, Ōshida, Shimo-Shirataki, Tomisato and Washinosu stations are closed
March 26 - Higashi-Himeji, Nishi-kumamoto, Ishinomakiayumino, Odasakae and Maya stations opens
March 26 - Hokkaido Shinkansen starts its service from Shin-Aomori Station to Shin-Hakodate-Hokuto Station
March 26 - Museum of Natural and Environmental History, Shizuoka opens
 March 27 – Kumamoto gubernatorial election: Incumbent Ikuo Kabashima reelected for a third term
March 27 - Democratic Party (Japan) is established

April
April 2 - Tsuyama Railroad Educational Museum opens
April 16 – A 7.0 magnitude earthquake strikes Kumamoto prefecture, and kills at least 50 people and 3,129 injured.
April 24 – National Diet, House of Representatives: By-elections in Hokkaido 5th district and in Kyoto 3rd district

May
May 1–2 - G7 Kitakyushu Energy Ministerial Meeting
May 23 - Akatsuki (spacecraft) begins a scientific mission at Venus after a troubled 5-years travel
May 26–27 – The 42nd G7 summit was held on Kashiko Island

June
IUPAC declared the element 113 Ununtrium as Nihonium, first element in the periodic table whose name is derived from Japan.
 June 5 – Okinawa assembly election: Governor Onaga's anti-base, left-wing supporters expand their majority

July
July 10 – National Diet, House of Councillors: 24th regular election
July 10 – Kagoshima gubernatorial election
July 23 – Tatsuo Hirano, independent member of the House of Councillors from Iwate, joins the Liberal Democratic Party, giving the party the first majority of its own since the 1989 election defeat
July 26 - A knife attack in Sagamihara kills 19 people and injures up to 50.
July 31 – Tokyo gubernatorial, assembly by-elections

August
Japan at the 2016 Summer Olympics
 August 21: Russell M. Nelson dedicates the Sapporo Japan Temple, the 151st LDS temple and third LDS temple in Japan.

September
 July to September - According to Japan National Police Agency official confirmed report, 48 hospitalized patients were die, administer disinfectant liquid  giving for hospitalized patients in hospital, Yokohama. On 7 July 2018, a nurse of the main criminal detained and confessed, according to JNPA.

October
 October 16 – Niigata gubernatorial election
 October 21 - A Richer Scale 6.2 earthquake, with aftershocks in Kurayoshi, Tottori Prefecture, according to Japan Fire and Disaster Management Agency official confirmed report, 30 persons were wounded.
 October 23 – Okayama gubernatorial election
 October 23 – Toyama gubernatorial election
 October 23 – National Diet, House of Representatives: By-elections in Fukuoka, 6th district and in Tokyo, 10th district
 October 25 - Two explosions in a park in the Japanese city of Utsunomiya, Tochigi Prefecture, kill at least one person and injure three others. Local media report that a 72-year-old ex-military officer is responsible for the blasts. A fire the same day destroyed the suspect's house. (The Guardian), (BBC)

November
 November 20 – Tochigi gubernatorial election

December
5th: Abe declares his historic plan to visit Pearl Harbor
 December 18 - A bottoming net fishing  boat Daifuku Maru capsized off coast Matsue, Shimane Prefecture, according to Japan Coast Guard official confirmed report, nine people lost to lives.  
 December 22 - A massive fire in Itoigawa, Niigata Prefecture, according to Japanese Fire and Disaster Management Agency confirmed report, 17 person wounded.

The Nobel Prize
 Yoshinori Ohsumi: 2016 Nobel Prize in Physiology or Medicine winner.

Culture

Arts and entertainment
List of 2016 box office number-one films in Japan
March 4 - 39th Japan Academy Prize
March 12 - 10th Seiyu Awards

Sports
 October 9 – 2016 Formula One World Championship is held at  2016 Japanese Grand Prix
 October 16 – 2016 FIA World Endurance Championship is held at 2016 6 Hours of Fuji 
 October 16 – 2016 MotoGP World Championship is held at 2016 Japanese motorcycle Grand Prix

 2016 F4 Japanese Championship
 2016 Japanese Formula 3 Championship
 2016 Super Formula Championship
 2016 Super GT Series

 2016 FIFA Club World Cup
 2016 in Japanese football
 2016 J1 League
 2016 J2 League
 2016 J3 League
 2016 Japan Football League
 2016 Japanese Regional Leagues
 2016 Japanese Super Cup
 2016 Emperor's Cup
 2016 J.League Cup

Deaths

January

February

March

April
April 3, Kōji Wada, rock singer (b. 1974)

May
May 5, Isao Tomita, composer (b. 1932)
May 17, Yūko Mizutani, voice actress (b. 1964)

June
June 21, Kunio Hatoyama, politician (b. 1948)

July
July 31, Chiyonofuji Mitsugu, sumo wrestler (b. 1955)

August

September

October
October 20, Junko Tabei, mountaineer (b. 1939)
October 23, Mikijirō Hira, actor (b. 1933)

November
 November 29, announcer (b. 1926)

December
December 29, Jinpachi Nezu, actor (b. 1947)

See also
 2016 in anime
 2016 in Japanese music
 2016 in Japanese television
 List of Japanese films of 2016

References

 
Japan
Years of the 21st century in Japan
Japan
2010s in Japan